Los Maitenes de Villa Vieja Airport ,  is an airport serving Río Bueno, a town in the Los Ríos Region of Chile.

The runway has an additional  of grass overrun on the north end.

See also

Transport in Chile
List of airports in Chile

References

External links
OpenStreetMap - Los Maitenes de Villa Vieja
OurAirports - Los Maitenes de Villa Vieja
FallingRain - Los Maitenes de Villa Vieja Airport

Airports in Chile
Airports in Los Ríos Region